Quitzdorf am See is a municipality in the district Görlitz, Saxony, Germany. It is named after the village Quitzdorf which was abandoned 1969 to make room for a reservoir.

References 

Populated places in Görlitz (district)